Roy Austin Forbes (April 6, 1922 – April 12, 2017) was a Canadian ice hockey player. He was a member of the Ottawa RCAF Flyers who won the gold medal in ice hockey for Canada at the 1948 Winter Olympics in St. Moritz.

The 1948 Winter Olympics were to be held in St. Moritz, Switzerland. They were then officially known as the V Olympic Winter Games as they were the first Olympic games to be celebrated after World War II. In the fall of 1947, the Canadian Amateur Hockey Association invited the RCAF to form Canada’s Olympic ice hockey squad. Although Forbes traveled to St. Moritz as a member of Canada national hockey team, due to tournament rules that allowed teams to dress only twelve players, Forbes was used as a reserve and did not get into game play during the 1948 Olympics. Nonetheless, Forbes was a member of the team that won Canada’s first gold medal in Olympic hockey since 1932, and he was given an Olympic Gold Medal.

Honours
In 2001 Roy Forbes was honoured by the Canadian Forces when it was announced that the 1948 RCAF Flyers were selected as Canada’s greatest military athletes of the 20th century. On March 6, 2017, Forbes participated in a pregame ceremony before the Winnipeg Jets vs San Jose Sharks game at MTS Centre in Winnipeg in which he dropped the puck in a ceremonial face-off. Forbes was given a standing ovation by the capacity crowd.

References

1922 births
2017 deaths
Canadian ice hockey players
Canadian military personnel of World War II
Ice hockey players at the 1948 Winter Olympics
Olympic gold medalists for Canada
Olympic ice hockey players of Canada
Sportspeople from Portage la Prairie
Medalists at the 1948 Winter Olympics
Ice hockey people from Manitoba